Anne-Marie von Schutzbar genannt Milchling (3 July 1903 – 1 January 1991) was the second wife of Nikolaus, Hereditary Grand Duke of Oldenburg, pretender to the Grand Duchy of Oldenburg.

Early life
Anne-Marie was born at Hann. Münden, Kingdom of Prussia (now Lower Saxony) on 3 July 1903. She was the only daughter of Rudolf von Schutzbar gen. Milchling (1853–1935), Prussian Royal Chamberlain and Rittmeister, and his wife Rose Marston.

Her family, Schutzbar genannt Milchling, belonged to an Upper Hesse, later baronial, noble family.

Marriage and family
Anne-Marie married on 15 June 1924, in Hohenhaus (in the town of Radebeul), to Count Bechtold von Bernstorff (b. 1902). They divorced in 1948.

They had one daughter:
 Countess Verena von Bernstorff (b. 21 August 1936), married Count Joachim von Bernstorff (b. 14 November 1911)
 Countess Andrea von Bernstorff (b. 24 January 1964), married in 2006 Prof. Dr. Peter Raue (b. 4 February 1941)

Anne-Marie married secondly on 20 September 1950, in Güldenstein, to Nikolaus, Hereditary Grand Duke of Oldenburg, the third child and first son of Frederick Augustus II, Grand Duke of Oldenburg (1852–1931) and Duchess Elisabeth Alexandrine of Mecklenburg-Schwerin (1869–1955). Nikolaus first wife Princess Helena of Waldeck and Pyrmont had died in 1948. They had no children.

Notes and sources

|-

1903 births
1991 deaths
People from Göttingen (district)
Anne-Marie